América Televisión is a Peruvian television network, founded in 1958. The network is owned by Plural TV, which is a joint venture of the El Comercio and La República daily newspapers. It was the second television channel to be founded in Peru, the first commercial station with regular broadcasts, and Peru's highest-rated network.

History

Origins
The origins of América Televisión reach back to 1942, with the formation of the first privately backed radio network in Peru, Compañía Peruana de Radiodifusión, S.A. (Peruvian Broadcasting Company). Among the original stations was Radio América 94.3, which would eventually be owned by Antonio Umbert and Nicanor González Vásquez.

In early 1955, Umbert and González received a license to broadcast on television channel 4, and using RCA equipment from the United States and after intense work to construct the facilities, Radio América TV, callsign OAY-4D, began transmissions on Monday, December 15, 1958, at 18:15. Attending the first broadcast was then-Peruvian president Manuel Prado Ugarteche. Among the early programs were the first live broadcast, a football match from the Estadio Nacional de Lima, and the first fiction program on Peruvian television, Bar Cristal, which debuted in 1959.

In the 1960s, Arturo Pomar became the anchor of América's news programs.

The 1970s: World Cups and nationalization
The 1970s for channel 4 in Lima were a turbulent time. While the station carried both the 1970 and 1978 World Cups, in which the Peruvian national team was highly competitive, and the station added a news program in Quechua in the early 1970s (before its revival as an official language of the country), a major change came about when the military government of the time expropriated 51% of the shares in the station. Juan Velasco Alvarado's government created the state company Telecentro, which took over management of then C4 Television (renamed América in 1978) and its chief rival, Panamericana Televisión.

The 1970s also saw an introduction of color telecasts, in time for the 1978 World Cup, which was seen in color in Lima and some provinces, such as Tacna. In 1980, with the end of the military dictatorship, Telecentro was abolished.

One of the best dramas of the decade was 1972's El Adorable Profesor Aldao, which catapulted Yola Polastri to stardom.

The 1980s
In the 1980s, América continued its success. Programs like El Chavo del Ocho and other animated imports—ThunderCats, My Little Pony and He-Man among them—were major ratings winners, while Tulio Loza and Pablo de Madalengoitia became popular personalities. Its coverage of the 1988 Summer Olympics from Seoul included every game of the Peruvian women's volleyball team, which achieved a silver-medal finish. In 1988, to celebrate its 30th anniversary, the channel inaugurated a new studio facility known as "Estúdio 4".

The 1990s: Crousillat and Televisa
In 1992, the Mexican network Televisa acquired a significant stake in América, and two years later, businessman José Enrique Crousillat, who had close ties to the Azcarraga family of Televisa, became administrator of the station. Under Crousillat and Televisa, Mexican-produced telenovelas came to dominate the schedule. Among the strong suits of América in this area was a continued good run of imported animated shows, with Dragon Ball, Sailor Moon and Samurai Cats airing on the channel at this time, and Laura en América (1998–2001), a talk show hosted by Laura Bozzo that was popular on the international market.

Pomar died in 1993, leaving a new generation of journalists and expanded news programs; it was at this time that América added a morning newscast, Primera Edición (First Edition).

2001–2002: Political scandal in Peru, turmoil at América
Political scandal rocked Perú in 2000 with the discovery of the "Vladivideos", triggering a corruption scandal involving Vladimiro Montesinos, who was found to have bribed important business and political leaders, including the Crousillats. The scandal brought down Alberto Fujimori's administration and also was a black mark to América Televisión. In 2001, Crousillat's daughters took over the network, and at the same time, América fell from first to third in the ratings. Debts mounted, and creditors took over after a declaration of insolvency in late 2001 and the end of Crousillat's management in April 2002.

2003–present: Plural TV and a return to the top

In 2003, Plural TV bought the debt of América's creditors and took over the channel, injecting funds into it and hoping to resurrect its ratings leadership. Eric Jurgensen took over in management. The moves paid off, as beginning in 2004, América siphoned key personalities and programs from Panamericana, helping it to return to its traditional first place in the ratings.

In 2009, América began testing high-definition and 1seg telecasts using the Japanese-Brazilian ISDB-T system, first on UHF channel 31, then on its assigned UHF channel 24, with 1seg service beginning in April 2010. High-definition programming began in 2011.

In 2012, Crousillat announced that he would sell his remaining stake in the channel to the Peruvian state. It also continued broadcasting the Olympic Games to Perú, with coverage of the 2012 Summer Olympics from London.

In 2013, América launched a new digital service, Fusión Gourmet, a network specializing in food. It is América's second cable network; in 2012, it bought Canal N, an all-news channel started in 1999.

Currently, América is the ratings leader in Perú, with a 36% share of the national audience. It produces 65% of the shows it airs, and most of its imports still come from Televisa, with which it has retained a business relationship.

Productions Channel

Programming 
The channel's programming is generalist. América Televisión broadcasts both its own and imported productions, it broadcasts series and soap operas from Mexico (Televisa) and the United States (Univision). In addition, it broadcasts movies on weekends and also broadcasts live events such as the Copa América, the Peru national football team.

Services

América tvGO 
Creado en el 2012. Es una plataforma OTT con programación compuesta de novelas, series, magazines y contenido exclusivo. El servicio es de pago y el usuario se debe suscribir para poder ver las producciones de la cadena e interacciones transmedia como recibir comunicación de algunos personajes y votar en programas concurso.

External links
 Official Site

References 

Television stations in Peru
Television channels and stations established in 1958
Spanish-language television stations
Television networks in Peru
Mass media in Lima
1958 establishments in Peru